The Singapore Open Badminton Championships is an annual badminton tournament created in 1929. The Women's Singles was first contested in 1931. The tournament was canceled between 1942 to 1946 because of World War II and discontinued from 1974 to 1986. It returned in 1987 as Konica Cup and was held until 1999. There was no competition held in 1935, 1993, 1996 and 2000. The tournament returned in 2001 under a new sponsor. It was again canceled between 2020-2021 due to the COVID-19 pandemic. 

Below is the list of the winners at the Singapore Open in women's singles.

History
In the Amateur era, Helen Heng (1949–1955) holds the record for the most titles in the Women's Singles, winning Singapore Open seven times. Helen also holds the record for most consecutive titles with seven from 1949 to 1955.

Since the Open era of badminton began in late 1979, Zhang Ning (2001, 2003–2005, 2007) holds the record for the most  Women's Singles titles with five. Zhang also holds the record for most consecutive victories with three.

Finalists

Amateur era

Open era

Statistics

Multiple champions
Bold indicates active players.

Champions by country

Multiple finalists
Bold indicates active players.Italic indicates players who never won the championship.

See also
 List of Singapore Open men's singles champions
 List of Singapore Open men's doubles champions
 List of Singapore Open women's doubles champions
 List of Singapore Open mixed doubles champions

References

External links
Singapore Badminton Association
Badminton Asia

Singapore Open (badminton)